Allann Petitjean (born 31 July 1974 in Luxeuil-les-Bains, Haute-Saône) is a French football midfielder currently playing for French Championnat National side Nîmes Olympique.

His previous clubs include FC Sochaux, SAS Epinal, Amiens SC, CS Sedan and Stade Reims.

References

External links
 
 

1974 births
Living people
People from Luxeuil-les-Bains
French footballers
FC Sochaux-Montbéliard players
Amiens SC players
CS Sedan Ardennes players
Olympique Alès players
Stade de Reims players
Nîmes Olympique players
SAS Épinal players
Association football midfielders
Sportspeople from Haute-Saône
Footballers from Bourgogne-Franche-Comté